Mahtomedi Senior High School is a four-year public high school located in Mahtomedi, Minnesota, United States. The school houses grades 912 with a total population of approximately 1,146 students. About 22% of this population are from surrounding districts due to open enrollment. The school colors are blue and gold, and the athletic teams are known as the Zephyrs. The district (district #0832) was created in 1870, and the original high school was built in 1930. In 1970 a new high school building was constructed several miles south east of the original building and this remains the current high school campus. Based on standardized test scores the State of Minnesota has awarded the school a five-star rating, the highest level that can be achieved. In 2006, Newsweek ranked the school #675 in its "List of the 1200 Top High Schools in America." The school has also made adequate yearly progress in compliance with No Child Left Behind standards. As of 2015 the school had a demographic of 91% Caucasian, 2% Black, 2% Asian, 2% Two or more races, 2% Hispanic or Latino, and 1% Native American. Finally, out of the total population, 9% of students qualify for free or reduced lunch.  Mahtomedi competes in the Metro East Conference (formerly known as the Classic Suburban Conference), having joined that conference at its inception in 2001 soon after being a founding member of the Metro Alliance in 1997.  Prior to 1997, Mahtomedi was a member of the Tri-Metro Conference.

The school was awarded the title "Exemplary High Performing Schools" along with being a profiled 2015 National Blue Ribbon School.

Academics

Mahtomedi High School has a high ranking academic program. Among the top ranked 1,200 high schools in the nation, Mahtomedi placed 663rd. The chart below depicts Mahtomedi academic achievement in comparison to the Minnesota and United States averages for the 20062007 school year.

Some other notable academic accomplishments include Mahtomedi's 513 students taking advanced placement classes, and, of the students who take the AP exams after these classes, an 80% passing rate. About 90% of students continue on to college after graduation, and Mahtomedi High School has a dropout rate of 1%.

In 2006, the Mahtomedi School District proposed a plan to create a magnet program within the high school. This program will focus mainly on technology and engineering, to hopefully increase enrollment. As of 2017, the proposition has not been implemented.

Mahtomedi also has a very successful band program, with three band classes (two concert, one jazz), and two before-school jazz bands, led by director Laura Goucher.

Athletics

Mahtomedi High School competes in the Minnesota High School League, and has athletic teams for fall, winter and spring sports. These teams include boys' and girls' soccer, boys' and girls' cross country, football, girls' swimming and diving, volleyball, boys' and girls' tennis, boys' and girls' basketball, gymnastics, Alpine and Nordic skiing, boys' and girls' hockey, wrestling, baseball, softball, boys' and girls' golf, boys' and girls' lacrosse, and boys' and girls' track and field. All teams play at both the Junior Varsity and Varsity levels.

Athletic awards and honors

Girls Tennis - 1 State Championship
Boys Soccer - 1 State Championship
Girls Soccer - 6 State Championships
Boys Alpine Skiing - 9 State Championships
Girls Gymnastics - 10 State Championships, 8 Sportsmanship Awards
Football - 1 State Championship
Wrestling - 2 State Champions
Golf - 1 State Championship
Boys and Girls Nordic Skiing - Numerous Conference and Section Championships
Baseball - 1 State Championship
Boys Hockey - 2 State Championships

Clubs

Clubs at Mahtomedi High School include:

Chess Club
Coding Club
Debate Team
Dungeons and Dragons Club
Thespian Society
Eco-Club
French Club
Gay-Straight Alliance (GSA)
Fellowship of Christian Athletes (FCA)
Mahtomedi Generations
Girls in Engineering
Interact
NAHS
National Honor Society (NHS)
Math Team
Newspaper
Politics Club
Real World Design
Rocket Team
Students Advocating for Equity (SAFE)
Science Club
Robotics
Students Against Drunk Driving (SADD)
Sailing Club
Student Leadership Council (SLC)
Spirit Club
Trap Team
Event Broadcasting
Yearbook

References

External links
 highschool.mahtomedi.k12.mn.us

Educational institutions established in 1930
Public high schools in Minnesota
Schools in Washington County, Minnesota
Magnet schools in Minnesota
1930 establishments in Minnesota